The Giro di Campania was a one-day road cycling race held annually in the region of Campania, Italy.

Winners

Notes

References

Men's road bicycle races
Recurring sporting events established in 1911
1911 establishments in Italy
Defunct cycling races in Italy
Sport in Campania
Cycle races in Italy
2001 disestablishments in Italy
Recurring sporting events disestablished in 2001
Super Prestige Pernod races